Great Yarmouth Corporation Tramways served the town of Great Yarmouth in Norfolk, England from 19 June 1902 until 14 December 1933.

History

The tramway system comprised two separate sections divided by the River Yare. The Haven Bridge over the River Yare was a lifting bridge and not suitable for a tramway.

To the east of the river was the larger part which opened on 19 June 1902. It ran from Wellington Pier, along Marine Parade, St Peters Road, King Street, Market Place, Northgate Street and Caister Road, and from Vauxhall station, along North Quay, Hall Quay, Regent Street, Market Place, Regent Street, Marine Parade and to Wellington Pier.
The site is now used as a motorbus depot.

The smaller western section was previously the horse drawn Yarmouth and Gorleston Tramway system.

Fleet
1-14 Brush Electrical Engineering Company 1905 - allocated to the Eastern section
15-26 Brush Electrical Engineering Company 1905 - allocated to the Gorleston section
27-35 Brush Electrical Engineering Company 1906, 1907

Tramcars
The fleet, in a livery of maroon and cream, consisted of:
 35 Brush open top double deck tramcars

Closure
The Corporation started to introduce motorbuses in 1920, and tram routes were closed from 1924 onwards. The western section finally closed on 25 September 1930, and the eastern section on 14 December 1933. Some of the tramcar bodies were used as chalets at Caister Holiday Camp.

References

External links
 Tramway ticket
 Great Yarmouth Corporation Tramways button
 Great Yarmouth Corporation Tramways badges

See also
List of town tramway systems in the United Kingdom

Tram transport in England
Great Yarmouth
Rail transport in Norfolk
3 ft 6 in gauge railways in England